Robin Grimsey Osborne,  (born 11 March 1957) is an English historian of classical antiquity, who is particularly interested in Ancient Greece.

Early life
He grew up in Little Bromley, attending Little Bromley County Primary School and then Colchester Royal Grammar School.  He was an undergraduate at King's College, Cambridge, where he also took a PhD degree.

Academic career
From 1982 to 1986 Osborne was a Junior Unofficial Fellow at King's College, University of Cambridge. In 1986 he moved to Oxford University, initially as a three-year fixed term Fellow at Magdalen College before in 1989 being appointed a University Lecturer in Ancient History and a Fellow of Corpus Christi College.

In 2001 Osborne returned to Cambridge to take up the position of Professor of Ancient History and was appointed a Fellow of King's College. He was elected a Fellow of the British Academy (FBA) in 2006. In the same year he was elected chair of the Council of University Classical Departments for a three-year term; in 2009 he was re-elected for a second and final term of office.

He was President of the Society for the Promotion of Hellenic Studies, 2002–2006. Osborne serves as the executive editor for World Archaeology, an academic journal published by Routledge, and is a member of the editorial boards of several other renowned journals including the Journal of Hellenic Studies, the Journal of Mediterranean Archaeology and the American Journal of Archaeology. Since 2016, Osborne has been the Vice-Chair of Council of the British School at Athens. Osborne is the Chair of the Faculty Board of the Cambridge University Faculty of Classics.

Osborne is the author of textbooks on archaic Greek history (Greece in the Making 1200–479 BC) and on Greek art (Archaic and Classical Greek Art); he has also written numerous seminal articles on Athenian law, ancient Greek social and economic history, and Classical art and archaeology. In 2019, he was joint winner of the Runciman Award for his book

Bibliography of works
Osborne, Robin (1985). Demos: the discovery of classical Attika. (1985). Cambridge: Cambridge University Press.
Osborne, Robin (1987). Classical landscape with figures. The ancient Greek city and its countryside. London: George Philip.

References

British Academy Fellowship entry
Profile at Cambridge Classics Faculty
Interview

1957 births
Living people
English historians
Scholars of ancient Greek history
Fellows of Corpus Christi College, Oxford
Fellows of King's College, Cambridge
Members of the University of Cambridge faculty of classics
Fellows of the British Academy
People educated at Colchester Royal Grammar School
Alumni of King's College, Cambridge
Fellows of Magdalen College, Oxford
Academics of the University of Oxford
Professors of Ancient History (Cambridge)
Presidents of the Classical Association